The Canadian International Trade Tribunal is an independent quasi-judicial body operating in Canada's trade system.  The administrative tribunal reports to Parliament through the Minister of Finance. The Tribunal was established on December 31, 1988, and is based in Ottawa, Ontario. The Tribunal is composed of a chairperson and up to six permanent members appointed by the Governor-in-council. Temporary members may also be appointed.

The Tribunal is mandated to act within five key areas:

 Anti-dumping Injury Inquiries: To inquire into and decide whether dumped and/or subsidized imports have caused, or are threatening to cause, injury to a domestic industry
 Procurement Inquiries: To inquire into complaints by potential suppliers concerning procurement by the federal government and decide whether the federal government breached its obligations under certain trade agreements to which Canada is party
 Customs and Excise Appeals: To hear and decide appeals of decisions of the Canada Border Services Agency made under the Customs Act and the Special Import Measures Act (SIMA) and of the Minister of National Revenue made under the Excise Tax Act
 Economic and Tariff Inquiries: To inquire into and provide advice on such economic, trade and tariff issues as are referred to the Tribunal by the Governor in Council or the Minister of Finance
 Safeguard Inquiries: To inquire into complaints by domestic producers that increased imports are causing, or threatening to cause, injury to domestic producers and, as directed, make recommendations to the Government on an appropriate remedy

See also 
 Canada Border Services Agency
 import, export, tariff, subsidy
 World Trade Organization
 General Agreement on Tariffs and Trade (GATT)

External links
 CITT Home Page

Further reading
 Paolo Davide Farah & Giacomo Gattinara, "WTO Law in the Canadian Legal Order", in: Claudio DORDI (ed.), The Absence of Direct Effect of WTO in the EC and Other Countries, The Interuniversity Centre on the Law of International Economic Organizations (CIDOIE), Turin: Giappicchelli, 2010, pp. 323–330, available on SSRN

Judiciary of Canada
Anti-dumping authorities
Foreign trade of Canada